The Kay-Nah-Chi-Wah-Nung Historical Centre, or Manitou Mounds, is Canada's premier concentration of ancient burial mounds. Manitou Mounds National Historic Site, as it was once called, is a vast network of 30 village sites and 15 ancient burial mounds constructed from approximately 5000 BP during the Archaic Period, to 360 BP; it is one of the "most significant centres of early habitation and ceremonial burial in Canada." It was designated as a National Historic Site of Canada in 1969.

Description 
The name Kay-Nah-Chi-Wah-Nung, is Ojibway and it means "place of the long rapids". Kay-Nah-Chi-Wah-Nung is also known as Manitou Mounds National Historic Site of Canada, GENWAAJIWANAANG, Rainy River Burial Mounds and Armstrong Mounds. The larger network of mounds extends from Quetico in the east through Rainy River and Lake of the Woods into south-eastern Manitoba. There are approximately 20 archaeological sites. The national historic site of Canada consists of a "-wide strip of lowland stretching  along the north bank of the Rainy River in the isolated area midway between Rainy Lake and Lake of the Woods.

Cultural and spiritual significance 

The south-facing hills overlooking the Rainy River served as an ideal location for growing, harvesting and sharing medicinal plants. Specimens were brought by many First Nations peoples when they came there to trade.

The site is considered sacred to the Ojibwa, on whose traditional land it is located:

Pre-contact history

The Rainy River, a relatively wide, straight and peaceful river (with the exception of the fluvial terraces at Long Sault Rapids), was a major North American waterway. With waterways the most important means of transportation, it served as a superhighway for a vibrant continent-wide trading network for thousands of years.

Archaeological artefacts and sites dated at approximately 5,000 BP, provides evidence that the first residents of the area were nomadic hunters, fishers and gatherers known as Archaic people. They inhabited many parts of North America and traded extensively over large areas. First Nations consider these traditional lands to have been theirs for time immemorial.

Kay-Nah-Chi-Wah-Nung has the largest concentration of earthwork burial mounds in Canada. The mounds were built on river terraces along the north side of the Long Sault Rapids on Rainy River. The first mound-builders at the site were the Laurel culture (c.2300 BP - 900 BP). They lived "in villages and built large round burial mounds along the edge of the river, as monuments to their dead." Their mounds remain visible today.

The Blackduck culture (c.1200 BP to 400 BP) also built mounds along the Rainy River. The Blackduck mounds were low and linear.

Treaty 3 
With the signing of Treaty no. 3 in 1873 to 1916, this site area was homesteaded by the Rainy Lake First Nations. Evidence of cabins and farm buildings have been found from that time on the site.

National Historic Site of Canada 

It was designated a National Historic Site of Canada in 1969.

Interpretive centre and museum
Opened in 1987, the interpretive centre showcases 10,000 years of aboriginal history. There is also a reconstructed village and tepee camp. In 1995, Parks Canada provided funds to improve the park, including the construction of the Kay-Nah-Chi-Wah-Nung Historical Centre and traditional Roundhouse for visitors and the local First Nations communities. 

Along with a conservation lab and collection storage, the centre is also used as a meeting place for Elders. It is an educational resource for teaching Ojibway culture, continuing its role as gathering place that began thousands of years ago.

According to the Ontario Museum Association, 

The museum with a futuristic design is surrounded by wilderness with resident bear and deer.

See also
 

History of Ontario
 List of historic places in Ontario
Ontario Heritage Act, legislation under which heritage sites of provincial or municipal significance are designated

Citations

References

External links
 Kay-Nah-Chi-Wah-Nung Historical Center

History of Ontario by location
Archaeological sites in Ontario
Archaic period sites in Ontario
Museums in Ontario
First Nations museums in Canada
National Historic Sites in Ontario
Ontario
Aboriginal National Historic Sites of Canada